
Year 811 (DCCCXI) was a common year starting on Wednesday (link will display the full calendar) of the Julian calendar.

Events 
 By place 

 Byzantine Empire 
 Byzantine–Bulgarian War: Emperor Nikephoros I organises a new campaign against the Bulgarian Empire, gathering an expeditionary force (most of the Roman army) from all parts of the empire. He is accompanied by high-ranking officials and aristocrats, including his son Stauracius and brother-in-law Michael I Rangabe (both later emperors temporarily). Krum, ruler (khan) of Bulgaria, sends envoys to sue for peace. Nikephoros refuses to accept the terms and marches through the Balkan passes towards Pliska, the Bulgarian capital. 
 July 23 – Nikephoros I reaches Pliska, and destroys a Bulgarian army of 12,000 elite soldiers who guard the stronghold. Another hastily assembled relief force of 50,000 soldiers suffers a similar fate. The Byzantines capture the defenseless capital. Nikephoros plunders the city and captures Krum's treasury. He burns the countryside, slaughters sheep and pigs, as he pursues the retreating Bulgars southwest towards Serdica (modern-day Sofia).
 July 26 – Battle of Vărbitsa Pass: Nikephoros I is trapped (probably in the Vărbitsa Pass) and defeated by the Bulgars, who use the tactics of ambush and surprise night attacks to immobilize the Byzantine forces. Nikephoros himself is killed; Krum has the emperor's head carried back in triumph on a pole, where it is cleaned out, lined with silver and made into a jeweled skull cup, which he allows his Slavic princes (archons) to drink from with him.
 Stauracius is installed as emperor at Adrianople (the first time a Byzantine emperor is crowned outside Constantinople). Because of a sword wound near his neck (during the Battle of Pliska), Stauracius is paralyzed. The imperial court is split between the noble factions of his wife Theophano and his sister Prokopia.
 October 2 – Michael I is declared emperor of the Byzantine Empire; Stauracius is forced by senior officials to retire to a monastery.

 Europe 
 Treaty of Heiligen: King Hemming of Denmark concludes a peace treaty with Emperor Charlemagne in present-day Rendsburg. The southern boundary of Denmark is established at the Eider River.

 Abbasid Caliphate 
 Fourth Fitna: Abbasid caliph al-Amin appoints Ali ibn Isa ibn Mahan as governor of Khurasan, in northeast Persia, and sends an army of 40,000 men with him against his half-brother al-Ma'mun. Ibn Mahan's army is defeated by a smaller army under Tahir ibn Husayn, at Rayy. During the fighting Ali ibn Isa ibn Mahan is killed.

Births 
 Abu Hatim al-Razi, Muslim hadith scholar (d. 890)
 Basil I, emperor of the Byzantine Empire (d. 886)
 Muhammad al-Jawad, ninth Twelver Shī'ah Imām (d. 835)
 Ōe no Otondo, Japanese scholar (d. 877)

Deaths 
 June 17 – Sakanoue no Tamuramaro, Japanese shōgun (b. 758)
 July 24 – Gao Ying, chancellor of the Tang Dynasty (b. 740)
 July 26 – Nikephoros I, emperor of the Byzantine Empire
 Ali ibn Isa ibn Mahan, Muslim military leader
 Charles the Younger, son of Charlemagne 
 Li Fan, chancellor of the Tang Dynasty (b. 754)
 Pei Ji, chancellor of the Tang Dynasty 
 Pepin the Hunchback, son of Charlemagne

References